Chynhale is a house near Callestick in mid Cornwall, England.

References

Houses in Cornwall